John P. Navin Jr. (born July 24, 1968) is an American film and television actor from Philadelphia. He is well known for his roles in the 1981 drama film Taps and the 1983 movie Losin' It, both of which co-starred Tom Cruise. He also starred in National Lampoon's Vacation as Cousin Dale.

Navin starred in the short-lived 1983 television series Jennifer Slept Here with Ann Jillian. Navin also appeared in the pilot episode of the TV series Cheers, which starred his Losin' It costar Shelley Long. He appeared as the first (on screen) patron of the bar, and delivered the series' first line, inauspiciously presenting Sam Malone with a fake I.D. and claiming he was a Vietnam veteran.

He also made appearances in other films and guest spots on television shows like The Facts of Life, Gimme a Break!, Silver Spoons, and Double Trouble.

He appeared in the Broadway play "Almost an Eagle" in 1982.

Filmography

References

External links

1968 births
Living people
American male film actors
American male television actors
American male child actors
Male actors from Philadelphia
20th-century American male actors